Pancho López may refer to:

Pancho López, a parody of Pancho Villa in The Bad Man (play) 1920, and three film versions of the play 
Pancho López (comics), early Argentine comic strip
"Pancho López" (song), parody of "Davy Crockett" by Lalo Guerrero 1955
Pancho López (performance artist)